Branden Turepu (born 25 July 1990) in the Cook Islands is a footballer who plays as a defender. He currently plays for Logan Metro Football Club in the Capital 4 league of the Football Brisbane zone and the Cook Islands national football team.

References

1990 births
Living people
Cook Islands international footballers
Association football defenders
Cook Island footballers